Željko Đurđić (8 November 1962 – 28 July 2014) was a Serbian handball goalkeeper.

Known locally by the nickname Džigi, he captained RK Proleter Zrenjanin to the 1990–91 European Handball Cup final where Proleter narrowly lost to Barcelona. He played 45 times for the Yugoslav national handball team.

Health issues
Falling out of the limelight after his retirement in 1996, his name began appearing in newspapers once again in late 2011. Đurđić said in an interview that he was living in poverty, and that although he needed surgery on both his knees, he was unable to afford it.

Đurđić died in Zrenjanin on 28 July 2014.

References

1962 births
2014 deaths
People from Doboj
Serbs of Bosnia and Herzegovina
Serbian male handball players
Yugoslav male handball players
RK Proleter Zrenjanin players